The men's 5000 metres at the 1966 European Athletics Championships was held in Budapest, Hungary, at Népstadion on 2 and 4 September 1966.

Medalists

Results

Final
4 September

Heats
2 September

Heat 1

Heat 2

Heat 3

Participation
According to an unofficial count, 32 athletes from 19 countries participated in the event.

 (1)
 (3)
 (2)
 (3)
 (1)
 (1)
 (1)
 (1)
 (1)
 (3)
 (1)
 (1)
 (2)
 (1)
 (1)
 (1)
 (3)
 (3)
 (2)

References

5000 metres
5000 metres at the European Athletics Championships